Sune Carlson (1909 – 22 September 1999) was a Swedish economist.   He was considered a pioneer in establishing international business as a research area.

Life and work 
Carlson obtained his MA in economics at the Stockholm School of Economics in 1932 and his PhD at the University of Chicago in 1936.

In 1951, he published "Executive Behavior", a classic study of CEO behavior.  In 1958, Carlson founded the Department of Business Studies at Uppsala University.  From 1972-1979, he was a member of the committee that selects the laureates for the Sveriges Riksbank Prize in Economic Sciences, the Economics Prize Committee, and served as an associate member from 1980.

He was a member of the Royal Swedish Academy of Engineering Sciences from 1965 and of the Royal Swedish Academy of Sciences from 1972.

Selected publications 
 Carlson, Sune. Study on the pure theory of production. (1939).
 Carlson, Sune. Executive behaviour: A study of the work load and the working methods of managing directors. Arno Press, 1951.
 Carlson, Sune. Executive behaviour. (1991).

Articles, a selection
 Carlson, Sune. "International transmission of information and the business firm." The Annals of the American Academy of Political and Social Science 412.1 (1974): 55-63.

References

External links 
 Sune Carlson

1909 births
1999 deaths
20th-century Swedish economists
Swedish business theorists
Stockholm School of Economics alumni
University of Chicago alumni
Academic staff of Uppsala University
Members of the Royal Swedish Academy of Engineering Sciences
Members of the Royal Swedish Academy of Sciences